TLP may refer to:

Places and facilities
 Tanjung Langsat Port, a shipping terminal in Johor, Malaysia
 Tarbes–Lourdes–Pyrénées Airport, an international airport in southern France
 Tirana logistic park, an industrial park in Albania

Businesses and organizations
 Tehreek-e-Labbaik Pakistan TLP, Far-right Islamist party in Pakistan.
 Tactical Leadership Programme, a NATO pilot training organization
 Tanzania Labour Party, a political party in Tanzania
 Tehreek-e-Labbaik Pakistan, an Islamist political party
 Telefones de Lisboa e Porto, now Portugal Telecom
 The Library Project, a non-profit organization that donates books and libraries in China and Vietnam
 Tradition Records, catalog code TLP, a record label 1956–1966
 Transitional Living Program for Older Homeless Youth, an American social assistance program
 TransMontaigne Partners L.P., stock ticker TLP
 Trinidad Labour Party, a former political party in Trinidad and Tobago

Science and technology

Biology and medicine
 Thalidomide, lenalidomide and pomalidomide, in the development of analogs of thalidomide drugs
 Thermolysin-like proteinase, an enzyme 
 Transient lingual papillitis, lumps on the tongue

Computing, electronics and software
 Thread level parallelism, an exploitation of task parallelism in computing
 TLP, an Advanced Power Management for Linux
 Traffic Light Protocol, a system for classifying sensitive information
 Transaction layer packet, an encapsulation of data in the PCI Express serial bus specification
 Transactional license program, a type of open volume software license
 Transmission level point, a telecommunications signal testing point
 Transmission-line pulse, a method of testing electronic circuits for tolerance to electrostatic discharge
 Translinear principle, a concept in translinear circuits

Other uses in science and technology
 Satish Dhawan Space Centre Third Launch Pad, a rocket launch site in India
 Tension-leg platform, a type of offshore platform used in production of oil or gas
 Transient lunar phenomenon, a rare illumination event on the surface of the moon

Other uses
 Filomeno Mata Totonac language, ISO 939-3 code TLP
 Tractatus Logico-Philosophicus, a work by Austrian philosopher Ludwig Wittgenstein